Shah Town is one of the neighbourhoods of Steel Town And Data Nagar BinQasim in Karachi, Sindh, Pakistan.

There are mostly Sindhi and Urdu speaking inhabitants in Shah Town, including Urdu speakers, Sindhis, Kashmiris, Seraikis, Pakhtuns, Balochs, Brahuis, Memons, Bohras, Christians and Ismailis. Shah Town is a (3,000 ha) residential area located opposite Steel Town and consists of two parts, Phase 1 and Phase 2. Serial numbers for houses are managed as "SR".l

References

External links 
 Karachi Website

Neighbourhoods of Karachi